Boonyakait Wongsajaem (simply known as Phak, born 29 June 1994) is a professional footballer from Thailand. He currently plays for Uthai Thani in the Thai League 3. as a goalkeeper.

Career
He played football in the 2013 Thailand National Games with Lamphun Warrior
He played for Suphanburi in 2015 and later for PTT Rayong in 2016.
He played for BG Pathum United in 2019 with One Year Contract .

Honours

Club
Uthai Thani
Thai League 3 (1): 2021–22
Thai League 3 Northern Region (1): 2021–22

References

1994 births
Living people
Boonyakait Wongsajaem
Boonyakait Wongsajaem
Association football goalkeepers
Boonyakait Wongsajaem
Boonyakait Wongsajaem
Boonyakait Wongsajaem
Boonyakait Wongsajaem
Boonyakait Wongsajaem
Boonyakait Wongsajaem